Stefan Mihajlović (born 24 June 1994) is a Serbian footballer who plays for Radnički Niš.

He is the son of former Yugoslav international footballer Radmilo Mihajlović.

Club career
Coach Aleksandar Janković invited Stefan Mihajlović, who at the time was a part of Red Star's youth squad, to travel to Turkey with the senior team for the 2012–13 winter break off-season.

Mihajlović, at the age of 17, played his first match with the Red Star Belgrade senior team in a friendly against Eyüpspor, during which he scored two goals. He made his professional debut for Red Star Belgrade on 9 March 2013 in a SuperLiga match against Novi Pazar.

Eventually, coach Janković was replaced by Ricardo Sá Pinto, who suspended Mihajlović in early April for missing practice without any excuse. However, the suspension was promptly removed after a friendly match with FK Jagodina's youth squad, during which Mihajlović scored a goal from a bicycle kick.

After he left Red Star Belgrade, Mihajlović spent some period without a club, before joining FK Rad. He also spent a period with Biel-Bienne and Chiasso in Swiss Challenge League, before he signed with Borac Čačak in summer 2016.

After a season with Borac, Mihajlović moved to Vojvodina on a three-year deal.

In the summer of 2018, he left Vojvodina and after 3 years came back to FK Rad. After a successful season in which he made 21 appearances and scored one goal, his contract in summer 2019 expired, and he signed with FK Radnički Niš.

Career Statistics
.

References

External links
 Stefan Mihajlović stats at Utakmica.rs
 Stefan Mihajlović profile at Srbijafudbal
 

1994 births
Living people
Footballers from Belgrade
Association football forwards
Serbian footballers
Red Star Belgrade footballers
FK Sloboda Užice players
FK Rad players
FK Borac Čačak players
FK Vojvodina players
FK Radnički Niš players
FC Biel-Bienne players
FC Chiasso players
Guizhou F.C. players
Serbian SuperLiga players
Swiss Challenge League players
China League One players
Serbian expatriate footballers
Expatriate footballers in Switzerland
Serbian expatriate sportspeople in Switzerland
Expatriate footballers in China
Serbian expatriate sportspeople in China